Daniel Francis Feehan (September 24, 1855 – July 19, 1934) was an American prelate of the Roman Catholic Church. He served as bishop of the Diocese of Fall River in Massachusetts from 1907 until his death in 1934.

Biography

Early life 
Daniel Feehan was born on September 24, 1855, in Athol, Massachusetts, to William and Joanna (née Foley) Feehan. When he was a young child, his family moved to Millbury, Massachusetts.  Feehan attended public schools in Millbury, where he befriended future US President William Howard Taft. 

Feehan completed his classical and philosophical studies at St. Mary's College in Montreal, Quebec, graduating with a Bachelor of Arts degree in 1876. He then studied theology at St. Joseph's Seminary in Troy, New York, for three years.

Priesthood 
Feehan was ordained to the priesthood for the Diocese of Springfield in Massachusetts by Bishop Francis McNeirny on December 29, 1879. His first assignment was as a curate at St. Bernard's Parish in Fitchburg, Massachusetts, where he remained for seven years. He then served as pastor of St. Luke's Parish in West Boylston, Massachusetts (1886–89). In 1889, he returned to St. Bernard's, serving there rector until 1907.

Bishop of Fall River 
On July 2, 1907, Feehan was appointed the second bishop of the Diocese of Fall River by Pope Pius X. He received his episcopal consecration on September 19, 1907, from Bishop Thomas Beaven, with Bishops Matthew Harkins and Michael Tierney serving as co-consecrators. During his 27-year tenure, he became known as the "Benevolent Bishop" and established thirty-six parishes.

In January 1934, Pope Pius IX named the Reverend James Edwin Cassidy as coadjutor bishop of the diocese to serve as Feehan's assistant and successor.

Death and legacy 
Daniel Feehan died on July 19, 1934, at age 78. Bishop Feehan High School, a parochial school in Attleboro, Massachusetts, was named after him when it opened in 1961.

References

1855 births
1934 deaths
Saint Joseph's Seminary (Dunwoodie) alumni
20th-century Roman Catholic bishops in the United States
Roman Catholic bishops of Fall River